Alfred Allen "Buddy" Armour (April 27, 1915 – April 1, 1974) was an American outfielder in Negro league baseball. He played between 1933 and 1951.

References

External links
 and Baseball-Reference Black Baseball Stats and  Seamheads

1915 births
1974 deaths
Indianapolis ABCs (1931–1933) players
Indianapolis ABCs (1938) players
St. Louis Stars (1939) players
St. Louis–New Orleans Stars players
Harrisburg Stars players
Cleveland Buckeyes players
Chicago American Giants players
New York Black Yankees players
Farnham Pirates players
Granby Red Sox players
Baseball players from Jackson, Mississippi
20th-century African-American sportspeople